The Treaty of Nettuno was an agreement made between the governments of the Kingdom of Italy and the Kingdom of Serbs, Croats and Slovenes on July 20, 1925, which permitted Italians to freely immigrate into Yugoslavia's coastal region of Dalmatia. Its ratification in the Yugoslav parliament took three years, as opposition Croatian Peasant Party representatives were infuriated with the treaty, calling it colonization by Benito Mussolini.

Following the assassination of Stjepan Radić, a new ruling coalition under Anton Korošec managed to ratify the treaty by a single vote on August 13, 1928, a move that came too late to placate the Italians yet further outraged the Croats.

See also  
 Rijeka  
 Sušak, Rijeka  
 Treaty of Rome (1924)

References

Sources
   

Treaties of the Kingdom of Italy (1861–1946)
Treaties of the Kingdom of Yugoslavia
Treaties concluded in 1925
Italy–Yugoslavia relations
Treaties entered into force in 1928
Interwar-period treaties